Iran protests may refer to:

During the reign of Shah Mohammad Reza Pahlavi
 1921 Iranian coup
 1953 Iranian coup
 Protests leading to the Iranian Revolution of 1979
During the Islamic Republic
 Iran student protests, July 1999
 2003 Iranian student protests
 2009 Iranian presidential election protests
 2011–12 Iranian protests
 2017–2021 Iranian protests
 2017–18 Iranian protests
 2018–2019 Iranian general strikes and protests
 2019–20 Iranian protests
 2021–2022 Iranian protests
 2022 Iranian food protests
 Mahsa Amini protests